Straight Up is an album led by American saxophonist Harold Vick recorded in 1966 and released on the RCA Victor label.

Reception
The Allmusic review by Jason Ankeny awarded the album 4 stars and stated "Vick alternates between tenor, soprano, and flute, greatly expanding the parameters of his sound while maintaining the simplicity that is his hallmark.".

Track listing
All compositions by Harold Vick except as indicated
 "If I Should Lose You" (Ralph Rainger, Leo Robin) - 4:15 	
 "Like A Breath of Spring (Bossa)" (Phil Bodner) - 2:55 	
 "Gone with the Wind" (Allie Wrubel, Herb Magidson) - 5:22 	
 "Straight Up" - 2:39 	
 "We'll Be Together Again" (Carl T. Fischer, Frankie Laine) - 5:47 	
 "Lonely Girl" (Neal Hefti) - 2:39 	
 "A Rose For Wray (Bossa)" - 5:42 	
 "Flamingo" (Ted Grouya, Edmund Anderson) - 4:56 	
 "Winter Blossom" - 4:58

Personnel
Harold Vick - tenor saxophone, soprano saxophone, flute
Virgil Jones - trumpet
Warren Chiasson - vibraphone
Albert Dailey - piano 
Everett Barksdale - guitar (tracks 2, 4 & 6)
Walter Booker - bass
Hugh Walker - drums

References

RCA Records albums
Harold Vick albums
1967 albums